The Lighthill-Thwaites Prize of the Institute of Mathematics and its Applications (IMA), in cooperation with the Institute's Journal of Applied Mathematics and the British Applied Mathematics Colloquium (BAMC), is a biennial prize established in 2011 by the IMA in honour of the achievement of its first two Presidents – Professors Sir James Lighthill and Sir Bryan Thwaites. The prize honours young applied mathematicians (of any nationality), and applicants submit papers for review. A committee reviews the papers, invites shortlisted candidates to give lectures at the Lighthill-Thwaites meeting, and then awards a First Prize.

Prize winners 
Source: https://ima.org.uk/awards-medals/ima-lighthill-thwaites-prize/

 2011 – Raphael Assier
 2013 – Laura Kimpton
 2015 – John Craske
 2017 – Doireann O’Kiely
 2019 – Matthew Butler
 2021 – Matthew Colbrook

Finalists 
Source: https://ima.org.uk/awards-medals/ima-lighthill-thwaites-prize/

 2011 – Igor Chernyavsky, S. Lind, A. Stewart, Alice Thompson
 2013 – Thomas Woolley, M. Moore, Matthew Hennessy
 2015 – Jonathan Black, Susana Gomes, Lorna Ayton
 2017 – Nabil Fadai, Oliver Allanson, Z. Wilmott
 2019 – Matthew Colbrook, Maximilian Eggl, Linnea Franssen, Matthew Nethercote, Jessica Williams
 2021 – Daniel Hill, Eleanor Johnstone, Kristian Kiradjiev, Ellen Luckins, Joshua Moore

See also 

 List of mathematics awards

References 

Mathematics awards